Maria Maddalena de' Pazzi may refer to:
Mary Magdalene de' Pazzi, Italian Carmelite mystic and saint of the Roman Catholic Church

See also
 Maria Maddalena (disambiguation)
Santa Maria Maddalena dei Pazzi, a church in Florence
Santa Maria Magdalena de Pazzis Cemetery, a cemetery in San Juan, Puerto Rico